The Chicago Board of Education serves as the board of education (school board) for the Chicago Public Schools.

The board traces its origins to the Board of School Inspectors, created in 1837. 

The board is currently appointed solely by the mayor of Chicago. Between 2024 and 2027, the board is slated to transition to consist entirely of elected members.

History

Board of School Inspectors (1837–1857)
On May 12, 1837, the Chicago Common Council (as the Chicago City Council was called at the time) used their powers as ex-officio commissioners of schools to appoint the first Board of School Inspectors, the city's school board. Despite the existence of this board, the Common Council however had ultimate power of acting as the de facto school board in the early decades under 1839 legislation. The Common Council initially held the authority to the members of the Board of School Inspectors. Ultimately, the mayor would gain the power to appoint the members with city council approval.

In 1855, the authority to remove the superintendent of Chicago Public Schools was given to the Board of School Inspectors by the same ordinance which created the city's first high school.

Board of Education
In 1857, the school board was renamed the Chicago Board of Education under the passage of a new school charter by the Illinois General Assembly, which also increased its membership from seven to fifteen.

In a charter passed by the Illinois General Assembly on February 13, 1863, the Chicago Board of Education was granted exclusive power over operating the city's schools. Greater administrative control was given to the board in 1865, when the General Assembly amended the 1863 charter, including moving control over the school fund, which had previously belonged to the Common Council

The Cities and Villages Act of 1872 made further clear the relationship between the roles of the Common Council and the Chicago Board of Education, strengthening the power of the Chicago Board of Education.

The board expanded ultimately to 21 members, before being reduced by the 1917 Otis Bill to eleven members. The term of office was increased by the Otis bill from three years to five.

In 1988, the Government of Illinois passed the Chicago School Reform Act, which expanded the Chicago Board of Education's size to fifteen seats.

In the original creation of the modern Chicago Board of Education in 1872, the mayor of Chicago was given authority to appoint the board's members. However, in 1988, the Government of Illinois' Chicago School Reform Act had created a School Board Nominating Commission consisting 23 parents and community members and five members appointed by the Mayor of Chicago who would recommend nominees to the Mayor of Chicago. This change lasted until 1995, when Government of Illinois' Chicago School Reform Amendatory Act made the power to appoint members of the board the unilateral authority of the mayor.

The Government of Illinois' Chicago School Reform Amendatory Act temporarily retitled the board as the "Reform Board of Trustees" from 1995 until July 1, 1999, after which period the name "Chicago Board of Education" was restored.

Elected school board (2025 onwards)
On July 29, 2021, governor J. B. Pritzker signed into law HB 2908, legislation that will make it so that, by 2027, the Board of Education will consist entirely of elected members. The legislation will also expand the size of the board to 21 members (including the president).

Per the legislation, in a November 2024 election, ten elected members will be elected from ten geographic districts to four-year terms that will begin in January 2025. From January 2025 through January 2027, these elected members will serve alongside 11 members (including the board's president) appointed by the mayor, subject to the approval of the Chicago City Council. With the exception of the president, each of the appointed members will hail from a different one of the ten electoral districts used for the 2024 Board of Education elections. The 2024 election will be the first time in Chicago's history that the city will hold a school board election. Per the legislation, in 2026, the number of electoral districts will be increased to twenty, and an election will be held for the Board of education members from the ten new districts without incumbents. The members elected in this election will serve four-year terms beginning in January 2027. Resultantly, beginning in January 2027, each geographic district will be represented by a single elected member. Also in 2026, the board's president will be elected at-large to a four-year term. The legislation dictates that the convention of having twenty members from geographic districts plus a board president elected at-large will remain place thereafter.

The Board of education will see members from ten of its geographic districts up for election every two-years. The electoral districts that will be used for Board of Education elections will have their boundaries drawn by Illinois General Assembly. With its 21 members, Chicago's Board of Education will become the largest school board among major cities in the United States by number of members. Under the new law, newly-elected members take office on January 15. If vacancies arise on the Board of Education, the remainder of the vacant seat's unexpired term will be filled by a mayoral appointee, with appointees being subject to the approval of the Chicago City Council.

Current members
The following table lists the members of the current board (as of February 2022):

President of the Chicago Board of Education

The Chicago Board of Education is led by a president. The current President of the Chicago Board of Education is Miguel del Valle.

Since the 1995 Chicago School Reform Amendatory Act went into effect, the president has been directly appointed by the mayor of Chicago, rather than being elected among the members of the board.

Beginning with the 2026 Chicago Board of Education elections, after which the Board of Education is slated to become an entirely-elected board, the president will be elected at-large.

References

 
1837 establishments in Illinois